James Pratt may refer to:

James Pratt (groom) (1805–1835), London man; one of the last two to be hanged for sodomy in England
James T. Pratt (1802–1887), American politician
James Bissett Pratt (1875–1944), philosopher
James Norwood Pratt (born 1942), author and authority on wine and tea
James Michael Pratt (born 1953), American writer and documentary filmmaker